The 1959–60 NCAA University Division men's basketball season began in December 1959, progressed through the regular season and conference tournaments, and concluded with the 1960 NCAA University Division basketball tournament championship game on March 19, 1960, at the Cow Palace in Daly City, California. The Ohio State Buckeyes won their first NCAA national championship with a 75–55 victory over the California Golden Bears.

Season headlines 

 The Athletic Association of Western Universities (AAWU) began play. It was renamed the Pacific-8 Conference in 1968, the Pacific-10 Conference in 1978, and the Pac-12 Conference in 2011.

Season outlook

Pre-season polls 

The Top 20 from the AP Poll and the UPI Coaches Poll during the pre-season.

Conference membership changes

Regular season

Conference winners and tournaments

Informal championships

Statistical leaders

Post-season tournaments

NCAA tournament

Final Four 

 Third Place – Cincinnati 95, NYU 71

National Invitation tournament

Semifinals & finals 

 Third Place – Utah State 99, St. Bonaventure 83

Awards

Consensus All-American teams

Major player of the year awards 

 Helms Player of the Year: Oscar Robertson, Cincinnati
 UPI Player of the Year: Oscar Robertson, Cincinnati
 Oscar Robertson Trophy (USBWA): Oscar Robertson, Cincinnati
 Sporting News Player of the Year: Oscar Robertson, Cincinnati

Major coach of the year awards 

 Henry Iba Award: Pete Newell, California
 NABC Coach of the Year: Pete Newell, California
 UPI Coach of the Year: Pete Newell, California

Other major awards 

 Robert V. Geasey Trophy (Top player in Philadelphia Big 5): Bill Kennedy, Temple
 NIT/Haggerty Award (Top player in New York City metro area): Satch Sanders, NYU

Coaching changes 

A number of teams changed coaches during the season and after it ended.

References